Paul Field is an Australian former rugby league footballer who played in the 1980s.

Field was selected to represent New South Wales directly from the New South Wales Country Rugby League, one of only three players to be selected straight from a country club to play for the Blues. Field played for Cootamundra and was selected for games II and III of the 1983 State of Origin series.

Field is still involved with rugby league and is currently president of the Group 9 Cootamundra Bulldogs.

References

Australian rugby league administrators
Australian rugby league players
New South Wales Rugby League State of Origin players
Living people
Rugby league hookers
Place of birth missing (living people)
Year of birth missing (living people)